Claus Christian Gulmann (born 1942) is a Danish judge who served as Advocate General and Judge at the European Court of Justice.

He has held the following positions:
Official at the Ministry of Justice
Legal Secretary to Judge Max Sørensen
Professor of Public International Law and Dean of the Law School of the University of Copenhagen
Private practice
Chairman and member of arbitral tribunals
Member of Administrative Appeal Tribunal
Advocate General at the European Court of Justice (7 October 1991 - 6 October 1994)
Judge at the Court of Justice (7 October 1994 - 10 January 2006).

See also

List of members of the European Court of Justice

References

1942 births
Living people
Danish jurists
Advocates General of the European Court of Justice
European Court of Justice judges
Danish judges of international courts and tribunals
Danish officials of the European Union